The Cub is an extant 1915 silent film drama produced by William A. Brady and directed by Maurice Tourneur. The film is based on a 1910 Broadway play, The Cub by Thompson Buchanan, also produced by Brady. This marks the only time stage actress Martha Hedman starred in a film. This film has been recently restored and available for viewing and DVD purchase.

Plot

Cast
Johnny Hines - Steve Oldham
Martha Hedman - Alice Renlow
Robert Cummings - Capt. White
Dorothy Farnum - Peggy White
Jessie Lewis - Becky King
Bert Starkey - Stark White

References

External links

1915 films
American silent feature films
Films directed by Maurice Tourneur
American films based on plays
1915 drama films
Silent American drama films
American black-and-white films
World Film Company films
1910s American films